Prince Arran or Arhan was a semi-legendary founder of Caucasian Albania. The early Armenian historian Movses Khorenatsi tells of a certain Aran, a descendant of the legendary Armenian patriarch Hayk through Sisak. According to Movses Kagankatvatsi he was 9th generation descendant of Japheth. He is regarded as progenitor of Aranshahik dynasty. According to a legendary tradition reported by Khorenatsi, Arran was a descendant of Sisak, the ancestor of the Siunids of Albania’s province of Syunik, and thus a great-grandson of the ancestral eponym of the  local albanians. Almost no information exists about him and his successors except names. He was contemporary of Abraham according to Movses Kagankatvatsi which seems to be a legend.

|-

References 

Legendary monarchs
Caucasian Albania